Joseph-Warren Plant (born 12 April 2002) is a British actor, best known for his role of Jacob Gallagher in the British soap opera Emmerdale. He has played the role since 2010 and was nominated for a British Soap Award in 2014 in the Best Young Performance category.

Plant has been nominated twice in the Best Young Actor category at the British Soap Awards in 2019 and 2021 respectively, as well as one nomination in the Best Young Performance category in 2014.

Early life
Plant was born in Blackpool on 12 April 2002 to mother Steph Plant. His father's name remains unknown. He was raised in Poulton-le-Fylde with his parents. Plant had been enrolled in the Scream Theatre School in Blackpool since he was four years old.

Career

Emmerdale
In August 2010, aged 8, Plant joined the cast of Emmerdale as Jacob Gallagher. The character was introduced along with his parents Justin (Andrew Langtree) and Alicia Gallagher (Natalie Anderson). During his time on the soap Jacob's storylines have included finding out he was adopted and that he is the biological son of Leyla Harding (Roxy Shahidi) and being groomed by Maya Stepney (Louisa Clein). Plant was nominated twice for Best Young Actor at The British Soap Awards in 2014, 2019 and 2021. Plant was discovered at Scream Theatre School in Blackpool by the Actors Agency division of Scream Management, which is now based at MediaCityUK, Salford Afterwards, Plant was recruited by Scream Management and acted on his behalf as his agent and secured him the role in Emmerdale. Plant portrayed the role of Harri Hart in the US action film Broken Hearts. In 2020, it was announced that Plant would be taking a six-month break from appearing in the show due to competing in Dancing on Ice.

Dancing on Ice

In 2021, Plant was a contestant on the British show Dancing on Ice where he was partnered with Vanessa Bauer. In February 2021, Plant and Bauer had to leave the show early due to both skaters testing positive for COVID-19.

Plant had not experienced any symptoms of COVID-19, however, after receiving a positive test, he had to withdraw from the series, claiming that he was "gutted". Even after completing the required isolation period in a hotel, ITV bosses at Dancing on Ice refused to let Plant and Bauer participate in the show again, with a spokesperson at ITV claiming that there was a "fear" that letting Plant skate and participate in the show again "may upset the apple cart". An official statement from ITV thanked Plant and Bauer for "all their dedication and beautiful performances".

Performances

Other work

In 2018, Plant appeared as a contestant on Soap Hand of Dance with Arran Crascall, a series by YouTuber Arran Crascall where soap stars from the United Kingdom compete to show off their dancing skills. To celebrate 50 years of Emmerdale being broadcast, he participated in a special of Ninja Warrior UK in 2022.

Charity work

Plant frequently participates in charity football matches in order to raise awareness of cancer and Down’s Syndrome.

Personal life

Plant attended Baines School in Poulton-Le-Flyde. He was in a relationship with Nicole Hadlow for three years, however, in 2021 just prior to his appearance on Dancing on Ice, the couple decided to separate, citing relationship issues between Plant and Hadlow as a result of his close relationship and partnership with his Dancing on Ice partner Vanessa Bauer.

Filmography

References

External links

2002 births
British male actors
British male television actors
People from Blackpool
Living people
People from Poulton-le-Fylde